Bethany United Church of Christ Cemetery is a historic church cemetery formerly known as  Bethany Reformed and Lutheran Church near Midway, Davidson County, North Carolina.  It contains approximately 400 gravestones, with the earliest gravestone dated to 1781.  It features a unique collection of folk gravestones by local stonecutters erected in Davidson County in the late-18th and first half of the 19th centuries.

It was listed on the National Register of Historic Places in 1984.

References

External links
 

Protestant Reformed cemeteries
Cemeteries on the National Register of Historic Places in North Carolina
Cemeteries in Davidson County, North Carolina
National Register of Historic Places in Davidson County, North Carolina